Denmark Presbyterian Church (The Denmark Church) is a historic church on Jackson-Denmark Road in Denmark, Tennessee.

It is a two-story gable-front frame building with Greek Revival architectural elements.  It was added to the National Register of Historic Places in 1983 an example of the Greek Revival style.

References

Presbyterian churches in Tennessee
Churches on the National Register of Historic Places in Tennessee
Churches completed in 1854
Buildings and structures in Madison County, Tennessee
National Register of Historic Places in Madison County, Tennessee
1854 establishments in Tennessee